The men's parallel giant slalom competition of the 2015 Winter Universiade was held at Sulayr Snowpark, Sierra Nevada, Spain at February 10, 2015.

Results

Qualification

Elimination round

The 16 best racers advanced to the elimination round.

Men's parallel giant slalom